UFC 18: The Road to the Heavyweight Title was a mixed martial arts event held by the Ultimate Fighting Championship on January 8, 1999 in New Orleans, Louisiana.  The event was seen live on pay per view in the United States, and later released on home video.

History
The event featured a UFC Lightweight Championship (now known as the Welterweight Championship) bout and six other bouts. UFC 18 was technically part two of what the UFC called "The Road To The Heavyweight Title", a tournament, spanning four events, held to crown the new UFC Heavyweight Champion after the title was vacated by Randy Couture (due to contract disputes).  

Part one was held at UFC Brazil, with Tsuyoshi Kosaka taking a win to advance to UFC 18. UFC 18 featured the first US appearance of MMA legend Bas Rutten, and the first appearance of the late Evan Tanner, who would go on to become the UFC Middleweight Champion.

UFC 18 marked the first card where the initials "UFC" replaced "The Ultimate Fighting Championship" in the logo and when mentioned by the announcers/commentators. The new logo used the similar character from the old logo (with hands on his hips instead of punching the globe) combined with the letters UFC on the bottom.

Results

See also 
 Ultimate Fighting Championship
 List of UFC champions
 List of UFC events
 1999 in UFC

References

External links
UFC 18 results at Sherdog.com

Ultimate Fighting Championship events
1999 in mixed martial arts
Mixed martial arts in New Orleans
MMA
1999 in sports in Louisiana
Events in New Orleans